The 2018 Mexican Grand Prix (formally known as the Formula 1 Gran Premio de México 2018) was a Formula One motor race held on 28 October 2018 at the Autódromo Hermanos Rodríguez in Mexico City.

Mercedes driver Lewis Hamilton entered the round with a 70-point lead over Ferrari's Sebastian Vettel in the World Drivers' Championship. Vettel's team-mate, Kimi Räikkönen, was in third, a further 55 points behind. In the World Constructors' Championship, Mercedes held a lead of 66 points over Ferrari, with Red Bull Racing a further 160 points behind in third place.

The race was won by Max Verstappen (his second win of the season), while Lewis Hamilton finished in fourth position, thereby taking his fifth Drivers' World Championship.

Qualifying 
Daniel Ricciardo took pole position from teammate Verstappen and with Hamilton in third. , this is the most recent pole position for Ricciardo.

Qualifying classification

Notes
  – Pierre Gasly received a 20-place grid penalty: 15 places for exceeding his quota of power unit elements and 5 places for an unscheduled gearbox change.
  – Romain Grosjean received a three-place grid penalty for causing a collision in the previous round.

Race 
Max Verstappen won the race after taking the lead on lap 1, his teammate Ricciardo bogged down badly at the start. The two Ferraris of Vettel and Räikkönen completed the podium. Lewis Hamilton's fourth-place finish was enough for him to claim the  World Drivers' Championship with two rounds to go. Pole sitter Ricciardo retired on lap 61, his eighth retirement of the year. Nico Hülkenberg finished a fine 6th place ahead of Charles Leclerc, while Stoffel Vandoorne equalled his best finish of the season in 8th place.

Post race 
In the immediate aftermath of the race, Ricciardo insisted that his car was cursed and said that he "didn't see the point" in doing the final two races of the season.

Race classification

Notes
  – Brendon Hartley received a 5-second time penalty for causing a collision.

Championship standings after the race 

Drivers' Championship standings

Constructors' Championship standings

 Note: Only the top five positions are included for both sets of standings.
 Bold text and an asterisk indicates competitors who still had a theoretical chance of becoming World Champion.

References

External links

Mexico
Mexican Grand Prix
Grand Prix
Mexican Grand Prix